Raccoon is an unincorporated community in Franklin Township, Putnam County, in the U.S. state of Indiana.

History
Raccoon was originally called Lockridge, and under the latter name was platted in 1880. A post office called Raccoon opened in 1880, and remained in operation until it was discontinued in 1934.

Geography

References

Unincorporated communities in Putnam County, Indiana
Unincorporated communities in Indiana